Peacock Suit is a song by English singer-songwriter Paul Weller that was released on 5 August 1996 as the first single from his fourth solo album Heavy Soul. It reached  5 on the UK Singles Chart in August 1996, making it the highest-charting single of his solo career.

Uncut magazine praised the song as a "snarling update of The Who's "I'm The Face"", rating it 25th in its list of Weller's 30 best songs.
Weller wrote the song in response to a newspaper article which criticised the Mod clothing movement.

Track listings
UK 7-inch, CD, and cassette single
 "Peacock Suit"
 "Eye of the Storm"

European CD EP
 "Peacock Suit"
 "Eye of the Storm"
 "I Shall Be Released"
 "Into Tomorrow"
 "Sunflower"
 "You Do Something to Me"

Charts

References

1996 songs
1996 singles
Go! Discs singles
Song recordings produced by Brendan Lynch (music producer)
Songs written by Paul Weller